The Billboard Top Folk Records of 1949 is made up of two year-end charts compiled by Billboard magazine ranking the year's top folk records based on record sales and juke box plays. In 1949, country music records were included on, and dominated, the Billboard folk records chart.

Both charts were topped by Hank Williams' "Lovesick Blues"; the song posted 4,182 points on the retail sales chart and 1,716 points on the juke box chart -- nearly doubling the point total of any other song. Williams also posted the No. 5 hit on the year-end charts with "Wedding Bells".

Eddy Arnold led all other artists with nine records on the year-end charts. Arnold's "Don't Rob Another Man's Castle" ranked No. 2 on both year-end charts with 2,270 retail points and 981 juke box points.

Four versions of the song "Candy Kisses" made the year-end charts. George Morgan's version was a No. 1 hit while the song also led to hits for Red Foley (No. 4), Elton Britt (No. 4), and Cowboy Copas (No. 5).

On the strength of Eddy Arnold's performance, RCA Victor led all other labels with ten records on the year-end charts. Decca ranked second with eight records followed by Columbia with five and Capitol with four.

See also
List of Billboard number-one country songs of 1949
Billboard year-end top 30 singles of 1949
1949 in country music

Notes

References

1949 record charts
Billboard charts